Warden is a station on the Bloor–Danforth line in Toronto, Ontario, Canada. It is located at the southeast corner of St. Clair Avenue East and Warden Avenue. The station is located perpendicular to St. Clair Avenue, and is the only Line 2 station with a north–south alignment.

The main pedestrian street entrance is on the east side of Warden, with another entrance from St. Clair along a walkway on the west side of the elevated tracks. Vehicle entry to the passenger pick up and drop off entrance is on the south side of St. Clair, east of Warden, exiting on to Warden south of St. Clair.

The station is on four levels: the subway platform is on the upper floor, the bus concourse to the connecting routes is below it, the two collector entrances and the concourse are found above street level, and the two entrances and the bus platforms are on the lower floor.

1,071 parking spaces are located at this station for commuter use, with 920 in the North Lot and 151 in the South Lot.

History 

Until 1973, TTC buses and subway trains serving the station were in separate fare zones and so the turnstiles and collector booths were placed between the bus bays and the subway platforms. When the zones were abolished, the layout was reconfigured to bring the buses inside the station's fare-paid area; one collector booth, left isolated inside the fare-paid zone, became an information booth.

The station's previous address was 3276 St. Clair Avenue East. Since around 2013-14, it has been changed to its present address, 701 Warden Avenue.

Future redevelopment 
Work started in 2022 to rebuild the bus terminal and to make the station accessible. The station is one of the last subway stations yet to be made accessible, due to the complexity of the station layout and its multiple levels. Both commuter parking lots are proposed to be redeveloped by the city government. In October 2021, the city announced that agreement had been reached with Tridel to build 600 residential units and a child care centre on the north parking lot.

Subway infrastructure in the vicinity 

After exiting the station eastbound towards Kennedy station, the track returns to a tunnel at the Chestnut Portal, where it continues on its diagonal alignment under the former Canadian National Railway (CNR) spur line.

There is a crossover west of the station from when it was Line 2's eastern terminus which is still used occasionally to short turn trains. There is also a small siding and storage shed west of the crossover on the south side of the above-ground tracks, which continue along the track bed of the former CNR line all the way to Victoria Park station.

Nearby landmarks 
Nearby landmarks include the Providence Healthcare, Warden Woods Park, Warden Hilltop Community Centre and Pine Hills Cemetery. It is near much vacant industrial land (including the former site of Centennial College and Warden Woods Mall/Power Centre) where major redevelopment is expected over the coming years, including numerous new housing developments on the former Power Centre property. It is also near the Toronto District School Board high school W.A. Porter C.I., which brings about 700 students in the station each year.

Surface connections 

When the subway is closed, passengers may board or disembark from buses at the intersection of Warden Avenue and St. Clair Avenue. None of these routes are accessible to those with disabilities as the only connection between the subway and the bus terminal is via stairs.

TTC routes serving the station include:

References

External links 

Line 2 Bloor–Danforth stations
Railway stations in Canada opened in 1968
Transport in Scarborough, Toronto